The Andover Canal was a canal built in Hampshire, England. It ran  from Andover to Redbridge through Stockbridge and Romsey. The canal had a fall of  through 24 locks, and for much of its length paralleled the River Anton and River Test. It opened in 1794, but was never a commercial success. The only dividend paid to shareholders was in 1859, using the proceeds from the sale of the canal to the London and South Western Railway, who bought it to lay a railway line along much of its course. The railway line is now also defunct.

History
The first survey for an Andover Canal was carried out in 1770 by Robert Whitworth, at a time when there was a great deal of canal building activity in the country. The canal would follow the valley of the River Anton, until it joined the River Test, and then follow that valley down to Redbridge. He produced an estimated price for a narrow canal, and another for a wider canal. The following year, Parliament was approached for permission to bring a bill, quoting an Act of Parliament from the reign of Charles II, which had granted rights to make several rivers, including the Test and the Anton, navigable. The bill was not submitted, which Phillips, writing his General History of Navigation in 1795, stated was due to objections concerning land purchase and possible damage to property, but a newspaper report in 1788 believed it was due to a lack of subscribers.

Interest in the scheme revived in 1788, when a meeting was held in Andover on 4 August. With support from Andover Corporation, a committee was appointed, and Robert Whitworth carried out another survey. Of the estimated £35,000, over £19,000 had been pledged within two weeks, and by the time the bill was submitted to Parliament in March 1789, this figure had risen to £30,700. An Act of Parliament was obtained on 13 July, which created "The Company of Proprietors of the Andover Canal Navigation", who had powers to raise £35,000 by the issuing of shares, and an additional £30,000 if required, of which £10,000 could be raised by issuing more shares and £20,000 by mortgage. Management was by a committee of 15, appointed from among the proprietors.

The canal was completed in 1794 at a cost of £48,000; £35,000 had been raised by issuing shares and £13,000 had been borrowed. The main cargos of the canal were coal, slates and manure coming in from Southampton Water and agricultural produce going out, although boats were often unable to find cargos for the journey back out to Southampton Water. The canal was never successful enough to pay a dividend until it closed in 1859, when income from the sale to Andover & Redbridge Railway produced one. In 1827 the canal was 8 years behind on its interest payments although this had improved to only one year by 1851.

Demise

The Manchester and Southampton Railway (MSR) agreed to buy the canal for £30,000 in 1845, but while the bill was progressing through Parliament, the railway company and the London and South Western Railway (LSWR) agreed to share ownership of both the canal and the railway line from Redbridge to Andover, at which point the Great Western Railway (GWR) objected, and the bill was defeated. Two years later, the MSR again tried to get an Act for the line, but again it was defeated. The LSWR, however, obtained a bill for a line from Salisbury to Basingstoke, which would pass through Andover, and were also empowered to buy the canal. Work on this line stopped in 1849, at which point the canal company bought the sixteen barges that worked on the canal and operated the boats themselves. This solved the problem of potential toll reductions which the barge operators were requesting. The two railway companies, now acting together again, decided that the canal should close, once the purchase money had been given to the shareholders. £9,000 was paid in 1851, but the rest was not. Local landowners then set up a company to complete the railway link between Basingstoke and Salisbury. It reached Andover in 1854, after which the canal maintained its traffic by reducing tolls, but the reduced income resulted in the interest on loans not being paid.

A complicated series of negotiations then took place, with the GWR attempting to buy the canal, then encouraging the canal company to form the Andover Canal Railway Company, which would build a broad-gauge railway along its course to Southampton, and finally both companies trying to buy the canal. In the end, they reached agreement, the LSWR made the purchase, and the line was laid to standard gauge. The canal ceased to operate on 19 September 1859, and the railway, nicknamed the Sprat and Winkle Line, was opened on 6 March 1865. Around  of the canal bed were used for the railway.

Much of this railway has since also been abandoned. As a result, most traces of the canal have completely disappeared, although the remains of a stretch of the canal can still be seen between Timsbury and Romsey.
In addition, several stretches of canal can be made out alongside the old railway track bed such as at Brook and also between Westover and Fullerton, where reasonable stone and brick remains of a lock are evident.

Course
The canal terminus was on the south side of the River Anton in Andover. It then followed the river to its junction with the River Test, and crossed both rivers on two aqueducts. Below the aqueducts, it followed the east bank of the river to Redbridge. Above Kimbridge, there was a junction with the Salisbury and Southampton Canal. The junction with the Test at Redbridge, from where access to Southampton Water was possible, was situated above the medieval bridge, although the original plans showed it a little further to the south on the foreshore.

Points of interest

See also

Canals of Great Britain

Bibliography

References

External links
Image showing the original map of the Canal

Canals in Hampshire
History of Hampshire
Port of Southampton
Canals opened in 1794
1794 establishments in England